Mansurabad (also Romanized as Manşūrābād; also known as Mansoori and Manşūr) is a village in Allahabad Rural District, Zarach District, Yazd County, Yazd Province, Iran. At the 2006 census, its population was 15, in 9 families.

References 

Populated places in Yazd County